The 1969 Grand Prix motorcycle racing season was the 21st F.I.M. Road Racing World Championship Grand Prix season. The season consisted of twelve Grand Prix races in six classes: 500cc, 350cc, 250cc, 125cc, 50cc and Sidecars 500cc. It began on 4 May, with Spanish Grand Prix and ended with Yugoslavian Grand Prix on 14 September.

Season summary
Giacomo Agostini on an MV Agusta continued to dominate the larger classes, once again winning the 350 and 500 classes against little factory-mounted opposition. The 250 class saw a tight three-way battle go down to the last race with Benelli's Kel Carruthers coming out on top against Kent Andersson and Santiago Herrero. Carruther's win would mark the last time a four-stroke machine would win the 250 championship. Kawasaki claimed their first world title with Dave Simmonds winning the 125 class. Spain's Angel Nieto won his first world championship for Derbi. It would be the first of many for the Spaniard. Former 125 world champion Bill Ivy was killed in a crash when his Jawa seized during practice for the East German Grand Prix at the Sachsenring. When Godfrey Nash rode a Norton Manx to victory at the Yugoslavian Grand Prix at the Opatija Circuit, it would mark the last time that a 500cc Grand Prix race was won on a single-cylinder machine.

1969 Grand Prix season calendar

Scoring system
Points were awarded to the top ten finishers in each race. Only the best of five were counted on 125cc championships, best of six in 50cc, 250cc and 350cc championships and best of seven in the 500cc championship, while in the Sidecars, the best of four races were counted.

500cc final standings

350cc Standings

250cc Standings

125cc Standings

50cc Standings

References

 Büla, Maurice & Schertenleib, Jean-Claude (2001). Continental Circus 1949-2000. Chronosports S.A. 

Grand Prix motorcycle racing seasons
Grand Prix motorcycle